According to the Old Testament, the covenant of the pieces or covenant between the parts is an important event in Jewish history. In this seminal event God revealed himself to Abraham and made a covenant with him (in the site known nowadays as Mount Betarim), in which God announced to Abraham that his descendants would eventually inherit the Land of Israel. 

This was the first of a series of covenants made between God and the Patriarchs.

Biblical narrative 

According to the biblical story, in  Abram’s most important encounter is recorded when the  made a covenant with him. The day started with a vision where Abram expressed his concerns about being childless, thinking his estate will be inherited by Eliezer of Damascus, a servant of his. God then reminds him of his original promise to make him a father of a “great nation” and then revealed that he would have a son born to him.

Later that day, at the drawing of the evening, Abram fell into a deep sleep where he encountered God again. God then prophesied to Abram that the nation born to him would be removed to another land where they must be trialed for four hundred years and afterward, they would be greatly blessed with many possessions and occupy their own land. This prophecy was that of the Israelites in subjection to Egypt, for four hundred years, before returning back to Canaan to claim it as their own. It was at this drawing of the night hour that Abram entered into a covenant with Yahweh who declared all of the regions of land that his offspring would claim: 

The covenant was formalized as God commanded Abraham to divide livestock and poultry into two pieces.

Modern scholarship 
Covenants in biblical times were often sealed by severing an animal, with the implication that the party who breaks the covenant will suffer a similar fate. In Hebrew, the verb meaning to seal a covenant translates literally as "to cut". It is presumed by Jewish scholars that the removal of the foreskin symbolically represents such a sealing of the covenant.

See also
Binding of Isaac

References

Abraham
Book of Genesis
Animal sacrifice
Lech-Lecha
Covenants in the Hebrew Bible
Theophanies in the Hebrew Bible